Rosalinda may refer to:

Rosalinda (given name)
Rosalinda (album), a 2015 album by Marco Di Meco
Rosalinda (musical), a 1942 Broadway musical adapted from Johann Strauss II's Die Fledermaus
Rosalinda (Mexican TV series), a Mexican telenovela starring Thalía
Rosalinda (Philippine TV series), a Philippine remake based on the popular Mexican telenovela
"Rosalinda" (song), a 2001 song by Thalía from her album Arrasando
Rosalinda (film), a 1945 Mexican historical drama film

See also
Rosalind (disambiguation)
Rosalinde
Rosalinda's Oldfield mouse, a species of rodent in the family Cricetidae